The 1953 Ohio State Buckeyes football team represented the Ohio State University in the 1953 Big Ten Conference football season. The Buckeyes compiled a 6–3 record.

Schedule

Coaching staff
 Woody Hayes - Head Coach - 3rd year

1954 NFL draftees

References

Ohio State
Ohio State Buckeyes football seasons
Ohio State Buckeyes football